Nepal Police Club (formerly known as Mahendra Police Club) is a sports club owned and managed by Nepal Police. The club competes in the Martyr's Memorial A-Division League, the top flight of Nepali club football.

History
Established in 1952 and named after King Mahendra Bir Bikram Shah Dev, Mahendra Police Club has been part of the new Nepal League since its inception in 2003. The club finished runners-up in the 2004-05 season and were third next year.

Year 2007
The year 2007 has been the most successful year for Mahendra Police Club. They started well in the 2006-07 season with a perfect blend of experienced and amateur players and clinched the Martyr's Memorial A-Division League title. MPC, who have won all Nepalese knock-out tournaments till date, have solid a backline led by experienced national defender Rakesh Shrestha with young but experienced Ritesh Thapa under the bar. Another national team veteran Hari Khadka, former national midfielder Ananta Thapa, Jumanu Rai and Ramesh Budhathoki hold the key to their fortunes in the AFC President’s Cup.

Another achievement of MPC was to be the runners-up in the AFC President's Cup 2007 after creating an upset in the semi-finals by beating Regar Tursunzoda. MPC won  being the runners-up.

Football 
Nepal Police Club currently plays in the Martyr's Memorial A-Division League, the top division of Nepalese football. The team has won three A-Division titles and one National League title.

Record

Squad

Cricket
Nepal Police is one of the three departmental teams to play in National League Cricket. Other eight regional teams compete with Nepal Police in the league. Manoj Katuwal is the coach of the team. They participated in 2011 National One Day tournament but finished as a runners-up after losing to APF Club in the final. But they defeated departmental rival APF Club to lift the title of 2011 Pepsi Standard Chartered T20 National Cricket Tournament.

Record

Squad

Achievements

Football 

AFC President's Cup
Runners-up: 2007
Martyr's Memorial A-Division League: 4
Winner: 2006–07, 2010, 2011, 2011–12
Runners-up: 2004-05
ANFA National League Cup: 2
Winner: 1998, 1999
Tribhuvan Challenge Shield: 4
Winner: 1978, 1979, 1981, 1983
Aaha Gold Cup: 5
Winner: 2002 (Then Caravan Gold Cup), 2003, 2008, 2009, 2010, 2018
Budha Subba Gold Cup: 3
Winner: 2000, 2001, 2003
Khukuri Gold Cup: 1
Winner: 2001
सताक्षी gold cup : 1
Winner: 2016
Birat Gold Cup: 2
Winner:  2004, 2016

Cricket 

 Prime Minister One Day Cup: 2
Winner:  2017, 2019
 National T20 Tournament: 1
Winner: 2011

Performance in AFC competitions
 Asian Club Championship: 1 appearance
 1998: First Round

AFC President's Cup: 4 appearances
 2007: Runners-up
 2008: Semi-Finalist
 2009: in Group Stage
 2011: 4th in Group Stage

 Asian Cup Winners Cup: 1 appearance
 1998–99: First Round

See also 

 Nepal Police
 Nepal Army Club
 APF Club

References 

Football clubs in Nepal
1952 establishments in Nepal
Cricket teams in Nepal
Police association football clubs